Itang (also spelled Etang; Ethiopic: ኢታንግ) is a town in the Gambela Region in western Ethiopia. Within Gambela, Itang belongs to Itang woreda which forms a special woreda. Located on the Baro River (also known as the Openo River or the Upeno River).

History 
The town's importance can be traced to  Article IV of the treaty signed by Emperor Menelik and the British minister, Harrington, in May 1902, which defined the boundary between Ethiopia and Sudan and designated the Itang area as a British trading enclave. However, Itang was too far from the Ethiopian Plateau, and after the Ethiopian government authorized the transfer on 8 October 1904, the concession was moved upstream to Gambela.

In the 1980s, the Second Sudanese Civil War led to the influx of refugees from Southern Sudan, with the Itang camp becoming the largest refugee camp in the world for some time.

Itang was partially flooded by the river in mid-1998 and July–August 1999.

Demographics 
Based on figures from the Central Statistical Agency in 2005, this town has an estimated total population of 3,601 of whom 1,929 were males and 1,672 were females. The 1994 national census reported this town had a total population of 2,106 of whom 1,176 were males and 930 were females.

According to the 1994 national census, its total population was 2,106. The ethnic breakdown was 53.7% Anuak, 28.54% Nuer, 6.79% Oromo, 6.41% Amhara, 1.57% Tigray, and 3% all others.

Notable people
Commander William Nyuon Bany and co-founder of the Sudan People's Liberation Army (SPLA), lived at Itang. His daughter Nyadol Nyuon, Australian lawyer and human rights activist, was born in the Itang refugee camp.

References 

Populated places in the Gambela Region